The 1892 Ohio State Buckeyes football team represented Ohio State University in the 1892 college football season. They played all their home games at Recreation Park and were coached by Jack Ryder. The Buckeyes finished the season with a 5–3 record.

Schedule

References

Ohio State
Ohio State Buckeyes football seasons
Ohio State Buckeyes football